Dicarbonyl(acetylacetonato)rhodium(I) is an organorhodium compound with the formula Rh(O2C5H7)(CO)2. The compound consists of two CO ligands and an acetylacetonate. It is a dark green solid that dissolves in acetone and benzene, giving yellow solutions. The compound is used as a precursor to homogeneous catalysts.

It is prepared by treating rhodium carbonyl chloride with sodium acetylacetonate in the presence of base:
[(CO)2RhCl]2 + 2 NaO2C5H7 → 2 Rh(O2C5H7)(CO)2 + 2 NaCl

The complex adopts square planar molecular geometry. The molecules stack with Rh---Rh distances of about 326 pm. As such, it is representative of a linear chain compound.

References

Organorhodium compounds
Homogeneous catalysis
Carbonyl complexes
Acetylacetonate complexes
Rhodium(I) compounds